Pistachio oil is a pressed oil, extracted from the fruit of Pistacia vera, the pistachio nut.

Culinary uses
Compared to other nut oils, pistachio oil has a particularly strong flavor. Like other nut oils, it tastes similar to the nut from which it is extracted. Pistachio oil is high in Vitamin E, containing 19mg/100g. It contains 12.7% saturated fats, 53.8% monounsaturated fats, 32.7% linoleic acid, and 0.8% omega-3 fatty acid. Pistachio oil is used as a table oil to add flavor to foods such as steamed vegetables.

Manufacturing uses
Pistachio oil is also used in skin care products.

References 

Vegetable oils
Nut oils